|}

The Slaney Novice Hurdle, currently known for sponsorship purposes as the Lawlor's of Naas Novice Hurdle, is a Grade One National Hunt hurdle race in Ireland. It is run in January at Naas Racecourse, over a distance of about 2 miles and 4 furlongs (4,023 metres) and during its running there are 11 flights of hurdles to be jumped. 
The race is often contested by horses who go on to compete at the Cheltenham Festival, such as the 1978 winner, Golden Cygnet, who went on to win the Supreme Novices' Hurdle and 2021 winner, Bob Olinger, who went on to win the Ballymore Properties Novices' Hurdle.

The race was run over 2 miles and 3 furlongs until 1995.  It was awarded Grade 3 status in 1993, raised to Grade 2 in 2005 and then to Grade 1 in 2015. The race is currently sponsored by Lawlor's Hotel.

Records
Leading jockey since 1983 (4 wins):
 Ruby Walsh –  	Homer Wells (2005), Mikael D'haguenet (2009), Briar Hill (2014), Bellshill (2016)

Leading trainer since 1983 (8 wins):
 Willie Mullins -  Homer Wells (2005), Mikael D'haguenet (2009), Gagewell Flyer (2011), Briar Hill (2014), Mckinley (2015), Bellshill (2016), Next Destination (2018), Champ Kiely (2023)

Winners since 1983

See also
 Horse racing in Ireland
 List of Irish National Hunt races

References

 Racing Post:
, 

National Hunt races in Ireland
National Hunt hurdle races
Naas Racecourse